Greece has participated in the Eurovision Song Contest 42 times since its debut in , missing six contests in that time (1975, 1982, 1984, 1986, 1999 and 2000). Greece's first win came in 2005 with "My Number One", sung by Helena Paparizou. The Greek national broadcaster, Hellenic Broadcasting Corporation (ERT), broadcasts the event each year and organises the process for the selection of the Greek entry. Greece has never finished last in the contest.

Between 2014 and 2019, Greece did not reach the top ten, including twice failing to qualify from the semi-final to the grand final ( and ).

History

Before participation
Before Greece as a country participated in the contest, some singers from Greece represented other countries. These singers were Jimmy Makulis for Austria, Yovanna for Switzerland, and Nana Mouskouri and Vicky Leandros ( and ) for Luxembourg.

1970s to 1990s

In 1974, during the Greek military junta, rock band Nostradamos won the first Eurovision participation contest ran by the state broadcaster EIRT to represent Greece at Eurovision, after broadcasting it since . However, due to a scandal, the band was not allowed to compete at Eurovision, and Greek laiko singer Marinella was sent instead. Three years after Greece's debut in the contest, the country achieved its first top-five result with the song "Mathima solfege" (Solfege Lesson) performed by Bessy, Paschalis, Marianna and Robert in 1977. The decade closed with Greece reaching eighth place twice in 1978 and 1979 with the songs "Charlie Chaplin" and "".

Greece was disqualified from the Eurovision Song Contest 1982 after it was revealed that Themis Adamantidis was to sing "", a previously released song. A known Greek folk song, it had been revised for the competition, but this violated the rules which stated that all songs had to be original in terms of songwriting and instrumentation and cannot be cover songs. Greece was forced to pay a fine and was allowed to return the following year. Had Adamantidis been allowed to perform, he would have appeared second at Harrogate. After returning in 1983, ERT stated that all of the possible songs were of "low quality" and decided not to participate in the  contest.

Greece returned once more to the contest in 1985, and Polina was selected in the 1986 national selection to represent Greece at the  contest in Bergen, Norway, but ERT pulled out of the contest unexpectedly. Polina stated that it was due to political troubles in Greece at the time, but she noted that a Eurovision website had learned that the real reason was that the contest was to be held the night before Orthodox Easter. Had she performed, she would have appeared eighteenth and she would have performed the song "". Greece returned to the contest in 1987 with the band Bang reaching tenth place. Overall the country reached three times top-ten in the 80s, with the other two songs being "" in 1981 and "" in 1989.

During the 1990s, Greece achieved two top-ten results with Cleopatra and Katy Garbi reaching fifth and ninth place in 1992 and 1993 respectively. The nation performed each year until the Eurovision Song Contest 1999, when it was relegated from participation due its five-year points average had fallen under the limit for participation after Thalassa's 20th place finish in 1998. The following year, ERT announced that it would not return at the Eurovision Song Contest 2000 due to financial reasons.

2000s

Greece returned in 2001, represented by the Greek-Swedish duo Antique, consisting Helena Paparizou and Nikos Panagiotidis. Their song "Die for You" was selected through the national final Ellinikós Telikós 2001 and placed third at the 2001 contest, a new record for highest placing for the nation.
Thirty-one years after its debut, Greece won for the first time in 2005 with Helena Paparizou singing "My Number One", which at the time tied for the record for the most number of twelve points allocated to a song (ten in total) along with Katrina and the Waves' 1997 "Love Shine a Light". The song also made Greece the first country not a member of Big Four to win the contest without going through a semi-final. After Eurovision, the song topped the charts in Greece, Cyprus as well as Sweden and entered the top ten in Romania, the Netherlands, Hungary, Belgium, as well as the American Billboard Hot Dance Club Play Chart. In 2005, Eurovision held a commemorative program, Congratulations: 50 Years of the Eurovision Song Contest, to celebrate 50 years of the contest, in which "My Number One" came fourth in a vote for the show's most popular entry, behind "Hold Me Now" (1987), "" (1958) and ABBA's "Waterloo" (1974).

Before Greece's win, the highest score was third place, achieved by duo Antique (of which Paparizou was a member) in 2001 with "Die for You" and then again by Sakis Rouvas in 2004 with "Shake It". In 2006, the 51st Eurovision Song Contest was held in Athens, in the O.A.C.A. Olympic Indoor Hall, following Elena Paparizou's victory the previous year. The two hosts were popular singer, and former contestant, Sakis Rouvas and Greek American presenter Maria Menounos. The singer representing Greece in their own country was popular Greek Cypriot artist Anna Vissi (who had also participated in 1980) achieving ninth place with the song "Everything". Until the end of the decade Greece achieved three more top-ten results, including seventh place by Sarbel in 2007 and third place by Kalomira with the song "Secret Combination" in 2008.

From 2004 to 2006, ERT had selected high-profile artists internally and set up national finals to choose the song, while in 2007 and 2008 it held a televised national final to choose both the song and performer. For the 2009 Eurovision Song Contest, ERT was able to secure a high-profile artist once again and planned a national final to choose the song. The song voted by the public was "This Is Our Night", another song performed by Sakis Rouvas, which eventually reached seventh place. Greece has been one of the most successful countries in the Eurovision Song Contest in the 21st century with 12 times finishing in the top-ten and 20 in total.

2010s
In 2010 Greece finished eighth with the song "", followed by a seventh place in 2011 with the song "Watch My Dance". In 2014, Greece finished in 20th place, which, along with 1998, were the country's worst result in the contest at that time. Greece was one of only three countries (along with Romania and Russia) to have never failed to qualify from the semifinals since their 2004 introduction (2004–15). In addition, Greece also qualified from the 1996 audio-only pre-qualifying round.

In 2013, ERT was shut down by a government directive and replaced with the interim Dimosia Tileorasi (DT) and later by the New Hellenic Radio, Internet and Television (NERIT) broadcaster. During this time, from 2013 through 2015, the Greek television station MAD TV organised the selection process. On 28 April 2015, a legislative proposal that resulted in the renaming of NERIT to ERT was approved and signed into law by the Hellenic Parliament; ERT began broadcasting once again on 11 June 2015, and shortly after confirmed their intentions to once again participate in the Eurovision Song Contest.

For 2016, ERT selected the Eurovision entry internally. They selected the band Argo with the song "Utopian Land". For the first time since the semi-finals were introduced in 2004, Greece failed to qualify for the final, after finishing 16th in the first semi-final.

In 2017, ERT selected the composer Dimitris Kontopoulos and the choreographer Fokas Evangelinos internally. They chose Demy for representing Greece in Kyiv. ERT agreed, and on 6 March 2017, Greece chose their song via a national final. Three songs were competed: "Angels", "This Is Love" and "When the Morning Comes Around". The final result was combined by 70% from televoting and by 30% from international juries from nine countries. Finally, "This Is Love" gained 70% and won the national final. At Eurovision, she qualified for the Grand Final, where she finished in 19th place with 77 points.

For 2018, the Greek broadcaster decided to hold a national final to choose the Greek entry to Lisbon and was to take place on 22 February 2018. However, on 16 February 2018 ERT confirmed Yianna Terzi as the Greek representative for the 2018 contest following the disqualification of Areti Ketime and Chorostalites, with the selected song being "". In Lisbon, Greece failed to qualify for the grand final for the second time on its participation history. In 2019, ERT selected internally Katerine Duska to represent Greece in Tel Aviv with the song "Better Love" finishing 21st. It was later revealed that Greece placed fifth in the semi-final, receiving a total of 185 points.

2020s
In 2020, ERT decided once again to select internally the Greek entry. Seven acts had been shortlisted to represent Greece in Rotterdam, including Irini Papadopoulou, Stefania, Ian Stratis, and the boy band One. On 3 February 2020, ERT announced Stefania as the Greek representative with the song "Supergirl". Greece was drawn to compete in the second semi-final and was to perform in the first position, but in 18 March 2020, the contest was cancelled for the first time in its history, due to the COVID-19 pandemic.

For 2021, ERT was one of the first four broadcasters (the other were Spain's RTVE, Netherlands' AVROTROS and Ukraine's UA:PBC) that confirmed its participation for the next edition with the same artist who would participate for 2020, in this case Stefania. It was also announced that the same team that was responsible for the songwriting and the choreography of the 2020 entry would also be used for the 2021 contest, and that the song would be selected internally. The selected song, "Last Dance", an 80's-pop song, premiered for the first time on 10 March 2021 at 17:00 EET through ERTFLIX, ERT's hybrid platform. Though Stefania placed well at the contest, finishing tenth, Greece's recent placements have been lower through their use of internal selections as compared to the national selection Ellinikós Telikós, which had produced seven top ten results consecutively.

For 2022, ERT opened a submission period on 7 September 2021 where artists and composers were able to submit up to three songs each for consideration by the broadcaster with a 10 October 2021 deadline. 25 artists were reported to have submitted applications from a total of more than 40 entries, where a seven-member jury panel shortlisted five entrants in late October 2021. On 15 December 2021, the committee selected the Greek Norwegian artist Amanda Georgiadis Tenfjord as the Greek entrant with the song "Die Together" to represent the country in Turin. In the contest, Greece managed to qualify from the first semi-final to the grand final. In the final, Greece finished in eighth place with 215 points: 57 points from the televoting and 158 points from the juries. It was later revealed that "Die Together" placed third in the semi-final, receiving a total of 211 points: 60 points from the televoting and 151 points from the juries.

Voting 

Greece is infamous for regularly giving twelve points to Cyprus and receiving twelve points from Cyprus. This exchange of twelve points may be influenced by close cultural ties. While Greece and Cyprus did exchange top marks a few times (1987, 1994, and 1997), there were also several years where this did not occur. In 1983, the second time Greece and Cyprus competed together, Greece awarded the Cypriot entry no points for the first and only time. However, between 1997 and 2013, the two countries always gave each other twelve points if presented the opportunity. Due to the controversies caused by political voting, two semi-finals were introduced for the 2008 contest in which Cyprus and Greece were unable to vote for each other in the semi-finals. In the build-up to the 2008 contest, however, the artists representing Greece and Cyprus jointly held a successful warm-up party at the Euroclub, attended by 17 other delegations from the contest and 1500 guests attracted by the promised "confluence of the Greek-Cypriot sound". However, for the first time since 1990, in 2015 Greece and Cyprus did not give each other 12 points, with Greece giving Cyprus 10 points and Cyprus giving Greece only 8 points, while both countries gave the maximum to Italy.

Participation overview

Congratulations: 50 Years of the Eurovision Song Contest

Hostings

Awards

Marcel Bezençon Awards

Barbara Dex Award

Related involvement

Heads of delegation
The public broadcaster of each participating country in the Eurovision Song Contest assigns a head of delegation as the EBU's contact person and the leader of their delegation at the event. The delegation, whose size can greatly vary, includes a head of press, the contestants, songwriters, composers and backing vocalists, among others.

Costume designers

Commentators and spokespersons

For the show's broadcast in Greece, various commentators have provided comment on the contest in the local language. At the Eurovision Song Contest after all points are calculated, the presenters of the show call upon each voting country to invite each respective spokesperson to announce the results of their vote on-screen.

Other shows

Stage directors

Conductors

Jury members
A five-member jury panel consisting of music industry professionals is made up for every participating country for the semi-finals and final of the Eurovision Song Contest, ranking all entries except for their own country's contribution. The juries' votes constitute 50% of the overall result alongside televoting.

Photogallery

See also 
Greece in the Eurovision Dance Contest – Dance version of the Eurovision Song Contest.
Greece in the Eurovision Young Dancers – A competition organised by the EBU for younger dancers aged between 16 and 21.
Greece in the Eurovision Young Musicians – A competition organised by the EBU for musicians aged 18 years and younger.
Greece in the Junior Eurovision Song Contest – Junior version of the Eurovision Song Contest.

Notes

References

External links
 The Greek Eurovision official profile on Facebook
 The Greek Eurovision official profile on YouTube
 The Greek Eurovision official profile on Twitter

 
Countries in the Eurovision Song Contest